These are the results of 2019 BWF World Senior Championships' 65+ events.

Men's singles

Seeds 
  Henry Paynter (bronze medalist)
  Søren Christensen (quarterfinals)
  Bruni Garip (gold medalist)
  Graham Michael Robinson (bronze medalist)
  Stefan Ohras (second round)
  Ole Krogh Mortensen (quarterfinals)
  Curt Ingedahl (quarterfinals)
  Per Mikkelsen (second round)

Finals

Top half

Section 1

Section 2

Bottom half

Section 3

Section 4

Women's singles

Seeds 
  Christine M. Crossley (silver medalist)
  Betty Bartlett (bronze medalist)
  Siew Har Hong (second round)
  Marie-Luise Schulta-Jansen (gold medalist)

Finals

Top half

Section 1

Section 2

Bottom half

Section 3

Section 4

Men's doubles

Seeds 
  Peter Emptage / John Gardner (bronze medalists)
  Sushil Kumar Patet / Surendra Singh Pundir (bronze medalists)
  Jeppe Skov Jespen / Per Mikkelsen (gold medalists)
  Christian Hansen / Ole Krogh Mortensen (second round)
  Curt Ingedahl / Bengt Randström (third round)
  Sorasak Chompoonuchprapa / Pongsilpa Ritipong (quarterfinals)
  Abdul Malique / Graham Michael Robinson (second round)
  Jiamsak Panitchaikul / Prapatana Vasavid (silver medalists)

Finals

Top half

Section 1

Section 2

Bottom half

Section 3

Section 4

Women's doubles

Seeds 
  Betty Bartlett / Eileen M. Carley (silver medalists)
  Anna Bowskill / Sylvia Penn (bronze medalists)
  Siew Har Hong /  Rose Lei (withdrew)
  Marguerite Butt / Brenda Creasey (gold medalists)

Finals

Top half

Section 1

Section 2

Bottom half

Section 3

Section 4

Mixed doubles

Seeds 
  Henry Paynter / Siew Har Hong (silver medalists)
  Christian Hansen / Gitte Attle Rasmussen (quarterfinals)
  William Metcalfe /  Rose Lei (second round)
  Peter Emptage / Betty Bartlett (gold medalists)

Finals

Top half

Section 1

Section 2

Bottom half

Section 3

Section 4

References 
Men's singles
Women's singles
Men's doubles
Women's doubles
Mixed doubles

2019 BWF World Senior Championships